Richard “Dick or Dickie” Roberts is a former American soccer forward who played professionally in the American Soccer League and earned one cap with the U.S. national team.

Professional
In 1948–49 he played for New York Americans, notably scoring a goal in both of the championship playoff tie breakers of that season. In 1949, Roberts signed with the Kearny Scots of the American Soccer League.  In 1952, he led the league in scoring with nineteen goals.  In 1953, he played with Brooklyn Hispano.

National team
On April 30, 1952, Roberts earned his lone cap with the U.S. national team in a 6-0 loss to Scotland.

References

Association football forwards
American soccer players
American Soccer League (1933–1983) players
Brooklyn Hispano players
Kearny Scots players
United States men's international soccer players
Living people
Year of birth missing (living people)